Amhuinnsuidhe Castle is a large 19th-century private country house on Harris, one of the Western Isles of Scotland. It was designated as a Category A listed building in 1971 and is now operated as a hotel and shooting estate.

History
Originally named Fincastle, the house was built in the Scottish baronial style by architect David Bryce in 1864–1867 for Charles Murray, 7th Earl of Dunmore (styled Viscount Fincastle until 1845), whose grandfather George Murray, 5th Earl of Dunmore had purchased the island in 1834. J M Barrie found inspiration for his play Mary Rose while staying at the castle in 1912 and visiting the nearby Loch Voshimid, "where we found Mary Rose". In 2003, Amhuinnsuidhe Castle Estate purchased the castle and the fishing rights, while the North Harris Estate was transferred into community ownership. The castle is now operated as a venue for fishing, shooting parties, weddings and corporate events.

Description
The house is squeezed into a narrow level space between the ocean and the hill rising behind the house and both have to be restrained by walls in front and behind. The lack of level ground is probably why the main road skirts the front of the house, very unusual for a country house. It is built of imported freestone, stugged and snecked ashlar; rubbled masonry is used at the rear. The castellated four-storey main block has a corner turret and rounded corners. Its eastwards three-storey extension has a first-storey oriel window with flanking bartizans. The flanking blocks are only three storeys high and the western block is recessed from the road. The eastern block is even with the main block, but it connected to the main block by a deeply recessed range, possibly to suggest a 17th-century addition to an older house. Gables are crowstepped throughout.

See also
Amhuinnsuidhe

Footnotes

External links

Amhuinnsuidhe Castle website

Houses completed in 1867
Castles in the Outer Hebrides
Category A listed buildings in the Outer Hebrides
Country houses in the Outer Hebrides
Harris, Outer Hebrides
Category A listed houses in Scotland